Phalaenostola is a genus of litter moths of the family Erebidae. The genus was erected by Augustus Radcliffe Grote in 1873.

Species
 Phalaenostola eumelusalis (Walker, 1859) – punctuated owlet moth
 Phalaenostola hanhami J. B. Smith, 1899 – Hanham's owlet moth
 Phalaenostola larentioides Grote, 1873 – black-banded owlet moth
 Phalaenostola metonalis Walker, 1859 – tufted snout moth

References

Herminiinae
Moth genera